Howard Bach (born February 22, 1979) is a Vietnamese-American male badminton player from the United States. He was the 2005 world champion in the men's doubles with Tony Gunawan.

Early life
He was born in Vietnam, Howard Bach came to the U.S. at the age of two, when his father, Cam Sen Bach, emigrated to San Francisco with his family in 1982. From 1991–1993, he attended Marina Middle School in San Francisco. When he was five years old, Howard Bach was brought by his father to the Golden Gate YMCA in San Francisco's Tenderloin District. It was here that over the next 11 years, Howard Bach would be coached by his father in badminton. Bach was a 16-year-old student at Galileo High School when he decided to dedicate himself to the sport of badminton. During his early years, he was also coached and mentored by USA coach of the year, Dick Ng. At age 16, he moved to Colorado Springs to train at the U.S. Olympic Site.

Career

2004 Olympics 
Bach competed in badminton at the 2004 Summer Olympics in men's doubles with partner Kevin Han. They defeated Dorian James and Stewart Carson of South Africa in the first round, then were defeated in the round of 16 by Jens Eriksen and Martin Lundgaard Hansen of Denmark.

2005 World Badminton Championships 
From a modest 13th seeded position Howard Bach partnered with Tony Gunawan to win the final of the men's doubles 15–11, 10–15, 15–11, against the Indonesian pair, Candra Wijaya and Sigit Budiarto. Thus winning the United States's first ever gold at the World Championships.

The Championships were held at the Arrowhead Pond arena in Anaheim, California.

2008 Olympics 

He partnered with Bob Malaythong in Badminton at the 2008 Summer Olympics in Beijing, advancing to the quarterfinals – the furthest any American has ever reached. They were defeated by the Chinese pair, Cai Yun and Fu Haifeng.

2012 Olympics 
Bach and Tony Gunawan competed in the 2012 London Olympics. They were eliminated during the pool play.

Achievements

World Championships 
Men's doubles

World Cup 
Men's doubles

Pan American Games 
Men's doubles

Mixed doubles

Pan Am Championships 
Men's singles

Men's doubles

Mixed doubles

BWF Superseries 
The BWF Superseries, which was launched on 14 December 2006 and implemented in 2007, was a series of elite badminton tournaments, sanctioned by the Badminton World Federation (BWF). BWF Superseries levels were Superseries and Superseries Premier. A season of Superseries consisted of twelve tournaments around the world that had been introduced since 2011. Successful players were invited to the Superseries Finals, which were held at the end of each year.

Men's doubles

 BWF Superseries Finals tournament
 BWF Superseries Premier tournament
 BWF Superseries tournament

BWF Grand Prix 
The BWF Grand Prix had two levels, the Grand Prix and Grand Prix Gold. It was a series of badminton tournaments sanctioned by the Badminton World Federation (BWF) and played between 2007 and 2017. The World Badminton Grand Prix was sanctioned by the International Badminton Federation from 1983 to 2006.

Men's doubles

Mixed doubles

 BWF Grand Prix Gold tournament
 BWF & IBF Grand Prix tournament

BWF International Challenge/Series 
Men's singles

Men's doubles

Mixed doubles

 BWF International Challenge tournament
 BWF International Series tournament
 BWF Future Series tournament

References

External links
 Orange County Badminton Club Team Member's Profile: Howard Bach
 
 
 
 
 

1979 births
Living people
Sportspeople from Ho Chi Minh City
Sportspeople from San Francisco
American sportspeople of Vietnamese descent
Vietnamese emigrants to the United States
American male badminton players
Olympic badminton players of the United States
Badminton players at the 2004 Summer Olympics
Badminton players at the 2008 Summer Olympics
Badminton players at the 2012 Summer Olympics
Badminton players at the 1999 Pan American Games
Badminton players at the 2003 Pan American Games
Badminton players at the 2007 Pan American Games
Badminton players at the 2011 Pan American Games
Pan American Games gold medalists for the United States
Pan American Games silver medalists for the United States
Pan American Games bronze medalists for the United States
Pan American Games medalists in badminton
Medalists at the 1999 Pan American Games
Medalists at the 2003 Pan American Games
Medalists at the 2007 Pan American Games
Medalists at the 2011 Pan American Games